Chehaw is an unincorporated community in Lee County, in the U.S. state of Georgia.

History
The community takes its name from the Chiaha, or Chehaw, a tribe of Creek Native Americans, who once settled at this site.

See also
Chehaw Affair

References

Unincorporated communities in Lee County, Georgia